The Roman Catholic Diocese of Lead in South Dakota (Dioecesis Leadensis in Latin) was created on August 4, 1902 by Pope Leo XIII. The diocese covered the portion of South Dakota west of the Missouri River, a region sometimes known as West River. Its seat was in Lead, South Dakota, at St Patrick's Cathedral. On August 1, 1930, the name of the diocese was changed to the Roman Catholic Diocese of Rapid City.

In 1995, the Diocese of Lead was restored as a titular see with Bishop Joseph Perry being the first to receive the titular see.

References

Lead
History of South Dakota
Christian organizations established in 1902
Diocese of Lead
Lead